The Aberdeenshire Council election of 2017 was held on 4 May 2017, on the same day as the other Scottish local government elections. The election will use the 19 wards created as a result of the Local Governance (Scotland) Act 2004, with each ward electing three or four councillors using the single transferable vote system form of proportional representation, with 70 councillors being elected, an increase of one member compared to 2012.

The Scottish Conservatives returned the most councillors, the first time it has been the largest party in the region since the 1982 election, when the area was under the Grampian Regional Council, although they were stopped short of an overall majority. The number of Scottish National Party councillors fell by a quarter but remained the second largest group. The Scottish Liberal Democrats picked up a couple of seats while the other parties gained roughly the same results as the previous election.

On 18 May, the Conservatives, Liberal Democrats and Aligned Independents formed an administration, with Jim Gifford (Conservative) elected as council leader and Bill Howatson (Liberal Democrat) was made Provost.

Results

Note: "Votes" are the first preference votes. The net gain/loss and percentage changes relate to the result of the previous Scottish local elections on 3 May 2007. This may differ from other published sources showing gain/loss relative to seats held at dissolution of Scotland's councils.

Ward results

Banff and District
2012: 2 x SNP, 1 x Conservative
2017: 1 x SNP, 1 x Conservative, 1 x Independent
2012-2017: 1 x Independent gain from SNP

Troup
2012: 1 x SNP, 1 x Independent, 1 x Conservative 
2017: 1 x SNP, 1 x Independent, 1 x Conservative
2012-2017 Change: No Change

Fraserburgh and District
2012: 2 x SNP, 2 x Independent
2017: 2 x SNP, 1 x Conservative, 1 x Independent
2012-2017 Change: 1 x Conservative gain from Independent

Central Buchan
2012: 2 x SNP, 1 x Conservative, 1 x Independent
2017: 1 x SNP, 1 x Conservative, 1 x Liberal Democrat, 1 x Independent
2012-2017: Change: 1 x Liberal Democrat gain from SNP

Peterhead North and Rattray
2012: 2 x SNP, 2 x Independent
2017: 2 x Independent, 1 x SNP, 1 x Conservative
2012-2017 Change: 1 x Conservative gain from SNP

Peterhead South and Cruden
2012: 2 x SNP, 1 x Independent
2017: 1 x SNP, 1 x Conservative, 1 x Independent
2012-2017 Change: Conservatives gain one seat from SNP

Turriff and District
2012: 1 x SNP, 1 x Liberal Democrat, 1 x Independent
2017: 1 x SNP, 1 x Conservative, 1 x Liberal Democrat, 1 x Independent
2012-2017 Change: 1 x Conservative win due to one additional seat compared to 2012

 = Sitting Councillor for Banff and District Ward.

Mid-Formartine
2012: 2 x SNP, 1 x Conservative, 1 x Independent
2017: 1 x SNP, 1 x Conservative, 1 x Liberal Democrat, 1 x Independent
2012-2017 Change: 1 x Liberal Democrat gain from SNP

Ellon and District
2012: 2xSNP; 1xCon; 1xLib Dem
2017: 2xSNP; 1xCon; 1xLib Dem
2012-2017 Change: no change

West Garioch
2012: 1xSNP; 1xLib Dem; 1xCon
2017: 1xSNP; 1xLib Dem; 1xCon
2012-2017 Change: no change

Inverurie and District
2012: 2xSNP; 1xCon; 1xLib Dem
2017: 1xSNP; 1xCon; 1xLibDem; 1xIndependent
2012-2017 Change: Independent gain one seat from SNP

East Garioch
2012: 1xSNP; 1xGRN; 1xLib Dem
2017: 1xSNP; 1xGRN; 1xLib Dem; 1xCon
2012-2017 Change: One additional seat in the assembly, gained by Conservatives

Westhill and District
2012: 2xSNP; 1xCon; 1xLib Dem
2017: 2xCon; 1xSNP; 1xLibDem
2012-2017 Change: Conservatives gain one seat from SNP

Huntly, Strathbogie and Howe of Alford
2012: 1xCon; 1xSNP; 1xLib Dem; 1xIndependent
2017: 2xCon; 1xSNP; 1xLibDem
2012-2017 Change: Conservatives gain one seat from Independent

Aboyne, Upper Deeside and Donside
2012: 1xCon; 1xSNP; 1xLib Dem
2017: 1xCon; 1xSNP; 1xLib Dem
2012-2017 Change: no change

Banchory and Mid-Deeside
2012: 1xCon; 1xSNP; 1xLib Dem
2017: 1xCon; 1xSNP; 1xLib Dem
2012-2017 Change: no change

North Kincardine
2012: 1xSNP; 1xLab; 1xCon; 1xLib Dem
2017: 1xSNP; 1xLab; 1xCon; 1xLib Dem
2012-2017 Change: no change

Stonehaven and Lower Deeside
2012: 1xCon; 1xSNP; 1xLab; 1xLib Dem
2017: 2xCon; 1xSNP; 1xLibDem
2012-2017 Change: Conservatives gain one seat from Labour

Mearns
2012: 1xCon; 1xSNP; 1xLib Dem; 1xIndependent
2017: 2xCon; 1xSNP; 1xLibDem
2012-2017 Change: Conservatives gain one seat from Independent

Changes since 2017
† Inverurie & District Conservative Cllr Colin Clark was elected as an MP for Gordon on 8 June 2017. He resigned his Council seat on 28 June 2017. A by-election was held on 12 October 2017 and Lesley Berry of the Conservatives won. She became an Independent on 1 June 2020.
†† West Garioch Conservative Cllr Sebastian Leslie was suspended from the party on 18 September 2018 and became an Independent having refused to pay his Council Tax.
††† Stonehaven and Lower Deeside Conservative Cllr Sandy Wallace resigned from the party and became an Independent on 12 December 2018 citing he had no faith in either the Prime Minister or the Conservative controlled Coalition in Aberdeenshire. On 10 November 2020, the Scottish Libertarian Party announced that Wallace had joined the party.
†††† Ellon & District SNP Cllr Richard Thomson was elected an MP for Gordon in the 2019 UK general election. He resigned his Council seat in April 2020. A by-election was held on 15 October and was won by the SNP's Louise Mcallister.
††††† North Kincardine Conservative Cllr Colin Pike resigned from the party and became an Independent on 6 March 2020.
†††††† Mearns SNP Cllr Leigh Wilson resigned from the party and became an Independent on 15 May 2020 citing professional circumstances.
††††††† North Kincardine SNP Cllr Alistair Bews resigned from the party and became an Independent on 17 May 2020 citing personal and professional reasons.
†††††††† On 1 June 2020 Mid-Formantine Conservative Cllr Jim Gifford was replaced as Leader of the Council and became an Independent. He was followed by Lesley Berry (Inverurie) and Jeff Hutchinson (Mearns).
††††††††† On 7 June 2020 Banff Conservative Cllr Mike Roy resigned from the party and became an Independent.
†††††††††† East Garioch Lib Dem Councillor, Fergus Hood, died in March 2021 following a prolonged illness. A by-election was held on 17 June 2021. It was gained by the Conservatives David Keating from the Liberal Democrats.
†††††††††† On 3 June 2021, Mid-Formantine SNP Cllr Karen Adam resigned her seat upon being elected a MSP to the Scottish Parliament for Banffshire and Buchan Coast. The SNP were defeated and the seat was gained by the Scottish Conservatives Sheila Powell.

By-elections since 2017

References

External links 
Aberdeenshire 2017 election results
Aberdeenshire 2012 election results

2017
2017 Scottish local elections
21st century in Aberdeenshire